Stéphane Owona (born 29 July 1985) is a French-Ivorian football player. He currently plays for CS Meaux.

A player trained as a midfielder but who can also evolve as an attacker as well. Player with good technique and good vision. He started playing football at FC Longjumeau and soon joined CS Bretigny Football.

After trying in Troyes, PSG, Amiens, he finally signed to Italy (Ternana Calcio).

In Italy his playmates are: Houssine Kharja, Fabrizio Miccoli, Luis Jiménez.

Then he went into exile in Cyprus, Ermis and participated greatly to the top level of Cyprus first league and then joined the biggest Syrian team Al Karamah winning the championship and the cup. he participed also to the AFC champions league.

References

External links 
 http://www.foot-national.com/26190-joueur-football-Owona-Stephane.html
 https://www.footballdatabase.eu/fr/joueur/details/257502-stephane-owona
 https://www.efccamp.com/effectif/stephane-owona/

Living people
Ivorian footballers
French footballers
French sportspeople of Ivorian descent
Association football forwards
Al-Karamah players
Expatriate footballers in Syria
1985 births
People from Longjumeau
Footballers from Essonne
Syrian Premier League players